The 2014 Donegal county football team season was the franchise's 110th season since the County Board's foundation in 1905. The team entered the season looking to improve on their poor 2013 run and return to prominence for the first time since winning Sam Maguire MMXII.

Jim McGuinness returned for his fourth season as the team's manager. Pioneer of the game's revolutionary tactic The System, he entered the season with two Ulster titles (2011, 2012), and added a third this season, before becoming the first manager in team history to lead his team to two All-Ireland Finals.

Personnel changes
Manager Jim McGuinness installed a new backroom team, consisting of Damian Diver, Paul McGonigle and John Duffy.

Ryan Bradley and Ross Wherity both emigrated after the 2013 season.

Ciaran Bonner and Leon Thompson returned to the panel for the first time since 2009. Christy Toye returned after missing the 2013 season due to illness. Returning also were Thomas McKinley (Naomh Colmcille) and Antoin McFadden — both excluded in the early part of the 2013 season after featuring as part of the 2012 panel. Conor Classon returned to the panel as well.

Hugh McFadden joined the panel after manager McGuinness noticed him during the 2013 Donegal Senior Football Championship. Also joining were Stephen McLaughlin (Malin) and Darach O'Connor.

Panel

Competitions

Dr McKenna Cup

National Football League Division 2

Donegal won promotion from Division 2.

2014 Division 2 table

Ulster Senior Football Championship

Donegal won the Ulster Championship for a third time in four seasons.

All-Ireland Senior Football Championship

Donegal reached the All-Ireland Final for the second time in three seasons.

Kit

Management team
Manager: Jim McGuinness
Selectors: Damian Diver, John Duffy, Paul McGonigle
Goalkeeping coach: Pat Shovelin
Strength and conditioning coach: Paul Fisher

Awards

All Stars
Donegal achieved four All Stars.

County breakdown
 Kerry= 5
 Donegal= 4
 Dublin= 3
 Mayo= 3

References

Donegal county football team seasons